Cégep de Sept-Îles is a bilingual College of general and vocational education (CEGEP) in Sept-Îles, Quebec, Canada. It is located at 175 rue De La Vérendrye. It was established in 1980.

External links
Cégep de Sept-Îles

Quebec CEGEP
Education in Côte-Nord
Sept-Îles, Quebec
Buildings and structures in Côte-Nord
Educational institutions established in 1980
1980 establishments in Quebec